Jack Waldron may refer to:
 Jack Waldron (actor) (1893–1969), American actor-comedian, singer and dancer
 John C. Waldron (1900–1942), United States Navy aviator
 Jack Waldron (basketball), (1912–1971), American brewery executive